Kalle Maalahti (born 30 April 1991) is a Finnish professional ice hockey player who is currently playing with HV71 in the Swedish Hockey League (SHL) on loan from SaiPa of the Liiga.

References

External links

1991 births
Finnish ice hockey defencemen
HV71 players
Ilves players
KooKoo players
Living people
People from Lappeenranta
Mikkelin Jukurit players
SaiPa players
Sportspeople from South Karelia